The Other Palace is a theatre in London's Off West End which opened on 18 September 2012 as the St. James Theatre.  It features a 312-seat main theatre and a 120-seat studio theatre. It was built on the site of the former Westminster Theatre, which was damaged by a fire in 2002 and subsequently demolished. It was owned by Andrew Lloyd Webber's Really Useful Theatres Group from 2016 to 2021, which gave it its current name.

Described as "the first newly built theatre complex in central London for 30 years", the building was designed by Foster Wilson Architects. The theatre began its debut season in September 2012 with the London premiere of Sandi Toksvig's Bully Boy.

After its acquisition by  Really Useful Theatres Group, Paul Taylor Mills was appointed as the new artistic director, with a programme intended to develop new musicals. The name change became official in February 2017. In June 2018, Chris Harper stepped into the role of Director of Programming. 

In May 2021, Lloyd Webber announced he was putting the theatre up for sale, calling the decision "heart-wrenching" and adding that he hoped "the future owners will love it as much as I have."

In October 2021, it was announced the theatre had been sold to Bill Kenwright. Kenwright had previously produced musicals including Heathers and Be More Chill at The Other Palace.

Notable productions 

 La Strada - London transfer following UK tour, directed by Sally Cookson, starring Audrey Brisson
 The Last Five Years (2016) - starring Jonathan Bailey and Samantha Barks
 Big Fish (2017) - UK premiere starring Kelsey Grammer, directed by Nigel Harman
 Eugenius! (2018) - World premiere (following concert at London Palladium in 2016)
 Heathers The Musical (2018) - UK premiere (following workshop in the studio in 2017) before transferring to the Theatre Royal Haymarket, starring Carrie Hope Fletcher
 The Messiah (2018) - London transfer following UK tour, written and directed by Patrick Barlow, starring Hugh Dennis, Martin Marquez and Lesley Garrett
 Falsettos (2019) - UK premiere starring Daniel Boys, Joel Montague, Laura Pitt-Pulford, Oliver Savile. Natasha J Barnes, Gemma Knight-Jones
 Amélie (2019) - UK premiere (London transfer following UK tour), starring Audrey Brisson
 Be More Chill (2020) - UK premiere (cut short due to COVID-19 pandemic)

External links
Official website

References

Theatres in the City of Westminster
Theatres completed in 2012
2012 establishments in England